The Rules of Dada is the second studio album by the Swedish electronic music duo Dada Life (Olle Corneér and Stefan Engblom). It was released on October 16, 2012 by Dada Life's independent record label So Much Dada and Universal. The album features a very heavily club-influenced electro house sound, and lyrically it discusses general carelessness with a lighthearted, almost humorous tone. Three of the album's eleven tracks are entirely instrumental, the remaining eight tracks feature vocals from various artists such as Britta Persson, Vincent Pontare, Michaela Shiloh, as well as Anthony Mills.

The album peaked at number 116 on the Billboard 200 during the week of November 3.

Background and recording 
Dada Life stated in an interview it took over a year and a half to produce "Rolling Stones T-Shirt", stating "We tried rock drums, electric guitars and even a strings section. But then we went back and just eliminated all of that. We went back to the original arrangement and added a little electronic bleep." They also noted sampling the sound of a fork being hit against a table on the album as well the sound of someone being punching in the stomach, an attempt to replicate "that ommph sound you get with a good hit."

Release and promotion 
"Kick Out the Epic Motherfucker" and "Feed the Dada" were released as singles, both of which charted on the Swedish song charts, peaking at number 18 and number 32 respectively. Remix albums of "Kick Out the Epic Motherfucker" and "Feed the Dada" were released on July 2, 2012 and September 10, 2012 respectively, the former featuring remixes by Datsik and Otto Knows.

Critical reception 

Speaking of Dada Life on The Rules of Dada, David Jeffries of Allmusic wrote "these merry pranksters are as 'Life' as they are 'Dada', meaning the EDM here is Deadmau5-big, Tiësto-clean, and crowd-pleasing, big-room stuff built for prime-time", noting "Kick Out the Epic Motherfucker" builds from "literate motivational seminar to lunkheaded rave riot" and cited "Rolling Stones T-Shirt" as the "singalong highlight", stating it "could have fallen off a David Guetta album."

Track listing

Charts

Credits and personnel 
 Jon Asher – songwriting
 Adam Baptiste – songwriting
 Johanna Berglund – vocals
 Olle Corneér – songwriting, production
 Stefan Engblom – songwriting, production
 Daniel Gidlund – vocals
 Anton Hård – songwriting, vocals
 Niclas Lundin – songwriting
 Anthony Mills – songwriting, vocals
 Britta Persson – songwriting, vocals
 Vincent Pontare – songwriting, vocals
 Michaela Shiloh – vocals

Credits adapted from The Rules of Dada liner notes.

References

External links 
 

2012 albums
Dada Life albums